The 1984 NASCAR Winston Cup Series was the 36th season of professional stock car racing in the United States and the 13th modern-era Cup series season. It began on Sunday, February 19 and ended on Sunday, November 18. Terry Labonte was crowned champion at the end of the season. This was the final year for Chrysler until Dodge returned in 2001.

Teams and drivers

Schedule

 Originally scheduled for November 4, but postponed due to rain.

Bold denotes NASCAR Crown Jewel event

Races

Daytona 500

Cale Yarborough completed a lap of 201.848 mph (324.828 km/h), officially breaking the 200 mph barrier at Daytona.  He drafted past Darrell Waltrip on the final lap, winning for the second year in a row, and fourth time in his career.  Richard Petty, making his debut with Curb Motorsports, stormed from 34th to lead over 20 laps before a camshaft broke.

Richmond 400
Ricky Rudd, still sporting swelling in his face from his bad Daytona crash, ran down Darrell Waltrip for his first win with Bud Moore Engineering.

Carolina 500
Bobby Allison grabbed his first win of the season, while a vicious four-car crash swept up rookie Rusty Wallace on Lap 372; the guardrail was damaged to where it took half an hour to repair it.  Before the race controversy erupted between the track and sponsor Warner Hodgdon over late payment of sponsorship fees; the fees were paid in full March 19.

Atlanta 500
Benny Parsons fought off Dale Earnhardt and Cale Yarborough in a three-car race; the win was Parsons' final Winston Cup win.  Darrell Waltrip was dropped from fifth to 10th after the race when NASCAR ruled he'd passed illegally to get a lap back late in the race.

Valleydale 500
Waltrip passed Tim Richmond with 44 laps to go for his seventh-straight Bristol International Raceway win.   He was pressured by Bobby Allison, who led 190 laps to Waltrip's 205; Allison faltered with 57 laps to go and finished 19th.

Northwestern Bank 400
Ricky Rudd led 290 laps but North Wilkesboro Speedway would not see him win as he faltered in the final 28 laps.  Tim Richmond pounced to the win, what would be his last with Raymond Beadle's team.

TranSouth 500
Two thunderstorms and multiple crashes permeated Darlington's annual spring race as Darrell Waltrip took his fourth Rebel 500 win.   Pole-sitter Benny Parsons hit the wall on the opening lap; on Lap Three a three-abreast stack-up for second led to a four-car crash involving Bobby Allison, Richard Petty (who led seven laps and still finished seventh), Geoff Bodine, and Dick Brooks.  Around Lap 137 following a Bobby Hillin Jr. crash Joe Ruttman, Terry Labonte, Buddy Baker, and Rusty Wallace crashed on the backstretch on the yellow.   In a later five-car melee in the second turn D. K. Ulrich climbed over Greg Sacks's hood; Tim Richmond crashed twice while Dave Marcis crashed while leading (he still finished 13th) after being sideswiped by Buddy Baker.  In all some thirty cars were involved in wrecks.

Sovran Bank 500
Ricky Rudd led 121 laps and Bobby Allison led 266 laps, but both were knocked out of contention in the final 60 laps as Geoff Bodine took his first career Winston Cup win and gave Charlotte car dealer Rick Hendrick his first win as owner.  Ron Bouchard, a longtime adversary of Bodine on NASCAR's Modified Tour, finished second. Bodine's victory saved All-Star Racing from shutting down as they were able to secure sponsorship from Northwestern Security Life for the rest of the season.

Winston 500

The Winston 500 at Talladega was the 2nd most competitive race in the history of NASCAR Winston Cup. The race had 75 different lead changes, a record that stood until the 2010 Aaron's 499 with 88 changes, which was matched in 2011.
Cale Yarborough passed Harry Gant in the final lap to take the win.

Coors 420
Nashville's Fairgrounds race track had seen numerous controversies over the years, but 1984's controversy may have topped all of them.  On lap 418 three cars crashed on the backstretch; Darrell Waltrip led laps 418 and 419 but Junior Johnson teammate Neil Bonnett passed him on the final lap under yellow; Dick Beaty of NASCAR initially ruled Bonnett the race winner; the following Monday, however, NASCAR reversed the decision since the yellow had flown before the last lap pass.

Budweiser 500
Richard Petty had not won at Dover Downs International Speedway since 1979 and had not won the track's spring/early summer race since 1969.  But he battled Bill Elliott, Tim Richmond, and Harry Gant to the win, his 199th Winston Cup win.   Gant led 218 laps but fell out while running in the top five 108 laps from the end, while Elliott cut a tire while running second with 40 to go.   It was Petty's first win not with Petty Enterprises since driving a Don Robertson Plymouth to two wins in 1970.

Because of the 1971 Myers Brothers 250 controversy and NASCAR rules regarding combination races of the time (compared to modern rules), there is a dispute if this was his 200th win.  (Petty, the highest-placed Grand National car in the combination Grand National and Grand American race, would be credited with a Grand National, or as it is called as of 2022, the NASCAR Cup Series, win under combination race regulations in play.)

World 600

Cale Yarborough's engine failure sealed a win for Bobby Allison; it proved to be his final win for DiGard Motorsports.

Budweiser 400
Terry Labonte passed Bobby Allison and led the final 23 laps for his first win of the season and first win at Riverside International Raceway barely two years after a very serious crash there.

Van Scoy Diamond Mine 500
Cale Yarborough outlasted his competitors to take the win at Pocono Raceway.  David Pearson drove Neil Bonnett's Chevrolet in qualifying and won the pole; he relieved Bonnett and finished 14th; ironically David finished just behind arch-rival Richard Petty, who led early before finishing 13th.

Michigan 400
Yarborough led 67 laps but faltered late as Bill Elliott achieved a breakthrough win, his second career win but first on a superspeedway and first with Coors sponsorship.

Firecracker 400

Richard Petty's last win. In the 1984 Firecracker 400, Richard Petty edged out Cale Yarborough by about 8 inches to visit Victory Lane for the 200th and what turned out to be the final time.

Pepsi 420
Geoff Bodine led 327 laps to the win at Nashville - it would turn out to be the final Winston Cup race at the Fairgrounds as Warner W. Hodgdon's racing empire began cracking.  Richard Petty started third but fell out after 212 laps with engine failure; it was his first race having to get engines from suppliers other than the DiGard team after the Gardners ended their engine deal with Curb Motorsports.

Like Cola 500
At Pocono Harry Gant burst past pole-sitter Bill Elliott on the opening lap and edged Cale Yarborough and Elliott at the stripe after leading 107 laps.  Bobby Allison led one lap but climbed the wall hard in the Tunnel Turn (one of nine yellows during the day) and finished a distant 28th.

Talladega 500

Dale Earnhardt fought off a ten car pack, passing Terry Labonte on the last lap to win his second consecutive Talladega 500. The race featured 68 lead changes among 16 drivers.

Champion Spark Plug 400
Terry Labonte led 117 laps as he, Darrell Waltrip, and pole-sitter Bill Elliott led 194 of 200 laps at Michigan International Speedway.  With no yellows, pitstops became the key as Waltrip stretch his fuel mileage for the win.

Busch 500
Darrell Waltrip led 144 laps but after halfway he fell out and finished 12th, ending his win streak at Bristol International Raceway.  Terry Labonte led the final 124 laps but had to withstand a challenge from Bobby Allison to grab the win, his fourth career win and first on a short track.

Southern 500
Amid numerous crashes Harry Gant led 277 laps to an easy win.   He thus moved into second place in points behind Terry Labonte.

Capital City 400
Darrell Waltrip, despite more wins than any other driver, found himself a distant fifth in points; he led 321 laps for the win but was still 185 points out of the lead.  Dale Earnhardt grabbed third in the race and second in points behind Labonte (eighth at the end) while Harry Gant finished ninth.

Delaware 500
Harry Gant and Terry Labonte combined to lead 385 of 500 laps at Dover Downs International Speedway en route to a 1-2 finish, Gant's third win of the season, as numerous crashes thinned the field; among those involved in wrecks were Bill Elliott, Rusty Wallace, Tim Richmond, and defending race champ Bobby Allison.  Dale Earnhardt led 35 laps but finished three laps down; Ron Bouchard led 68 laps but finished five laps down.  Richard Petty, winner at Dover in May, fell out with oil pump failure.

Goody's 500
Despite leading 313 laps to the win, Darrell Waltrip was now 215 points out of the lead following Martinsville's early-autumn race.   Terry Labonte finished second and held a 91-point lead over Harry Gant (fourth).  Pole-sitter Geoff Bodine led the first 37 laps before his oil pump failed.  Joe Ruttman fell out with engine failure and left Ron Benfield's team after two potent but ultimately futile seasons.

Miller High Life 500
Benny Parsons and Bill Elliott claimed the front row and combined to lead 284 of 334 laps.  Cale Yarborough and point leaders Harry Gant and Terry Labonte led 37 laps between them and finished 3-4-5 at the end.  Elliott grabbed the lead with 60 to go and pulled away to his second win of the season.  Gant finished fourth and stood 86 points behind Labonte.

Holly Farms 400
Junior Johnson's Chevrolets led 305 of 400 laps as Darrell Waltrip took his seventh win of the season and Neil Bonnett finished fifth.  But he was 246 points out of the lead and realistically was eliminated from the championship; the story fell to Harry Gant as he finished a close second in the race; combined with a ninth-place finish by Terry Labonte the finish helped Gant close to 59 points out.

Warner W. Hodgdon American 500
North Carolina Motor Speedway saw its final race under Warner Hodgdon sponsorship as the racing magnate's business empire was deteriorating more and more.  Numerous crashes erupted; a multicar melee on a restart eliminated Geoff Bodine and Tim Richmond.  The most spectacular crash came when Jerry Bowman flipped over and slid on his roof down the backstretch.  Bill Elliott and Harry Gant combined to lead 299 laps; in the final 55 laps Gant ran down Elliott and took the lead with two to go, but Elliott dove back under Gant and the two raced abreast the final two miles; they hit the stripe abreast and Elliott won by less than a wheel.  Labonte finished third and held a 49-point lead on Gant with two races to go.

Atlanta Journal 500
Geoff Bodine stormed into the lead on the opening lap and led 125 laps before his engine failed with 36 laps to go; this put Dale Earnhardt into the lead for his second win of the season, while pole-sitter Bill Elliott finished second.   Terry Labonte and Harry Gant fell out with engine failures and the points race stood with Labonte holding a 42-point lead on Gant.  Tragedy blackened the event when Terry Schoonover crashed some 200 miles in and was killed.

Winston Western 500
Geoff Bodine grabbed his third win of the season as Terry Labonte won the pole and finished third, finally clinching the Winston Cup title.  Harry Gant finished eighth and finished second in points.  Lame duck series champ Bobby Allison led 56 laps but slid off the track with four to go and finished seventh; arch-rival Darrell Waltrip led 33 laps but blew his engine and finished 34th.  Bodine referenced budding rumors about Riverside International Raceway's future when he said he was glad to have won as "they're going to tear this place down." Open-wheel driver Bobby Rahal made his only NASCAR start in this race, driving for Wood Brothers Racing. Rahal would drop out of the race on lap 44 due to mechanical problems.

Race Results 

Bold denotes NASCAR Crown Jewel event.

Full Drivers' Championship

(key) Bold – Pole position awarded by time. Italics – Pole position set by owner's points. * – Most laps led.

Rookie of the year
Rusty Wallace, a future hall of famer (see Class of 2013 hall of fame), beat out Dean Combs, Clark Dwyer, Tommy Ellis, Doug Heveron, Phil Parsons, and Greg Sacks to win the award in 1984. Only Wallace competed in all 30 races. Dean Combs competed in 12 races. Clark Dwyer competed in 26 races (he skipped rounds 25-27). Tommy Ellis competed in 20 races (he skipped rounds 1-4, 11, 13-14, and 28-30). Doug Heveron competed in 16 races (he failed to qualify for the spring Richmond race and the Southern 500). Phil Parsons competed in 23 races (He skipped rounds 3-4, 10-11, 13, 23-24, and 28). Greg Sacks competed in 29 races only skipping the spring Bristol race.

See also
1984 NASCAR Busch Series

References

External links 
 Winston Cup Standings and Statistics for 1984

 

NASCAR Cup Series seasons